A by-election was held for the New South Wales Legislative Assembly electorate of Coogee on 22 September 1928 because of the death of Hyman Goldstein.

Dates

Results

Hyman Goldstein died.

See also
Electoral results for the district of Coogee
List of New South Wales state by-elections

References

1928 elections in Australia
New South Wales state by-elections
1920s in New South Wales